Denison is a city in Crawford County, Iowa, United States, along the Boyer River, and located in both Denison Township and East Boyer Township. The population was 8,373 at the time of the 2020 census. It is the county seat of Crawford County.

History
Denison was laid out in 1856; the town was incorporated in 1875. Denison was named for its founder, J. W. Denison.

Geography
Denison is located at  (42.017187, −95.351124).

Climate

According to the Köppen Climate Classification system, Denison has a hot-summer humid continental climate, abbreviated "Dfa" on climate maps.

Demographics

2010 census
At the 2010 census there were 8,298 people, 2,816 households, and 1,866 families living in the city. The racial makeup of the city was 70.6% White, 2.3% African American, 0.6% Native American, 1.0% Asian, 0.2% Pacific Islander, 23.0% from other races, and 2.3% from two or more races. Hispanic or Latino of any race were 42.1%.

Of the 2,816 households 38.0% had children under the age of 18 living with them, 48.8% were married couples living together, 11.1% had a female householder with no husband present, 6.4% had a male householder with no wife present, and 33.7% were non-families. 28.1% of households were one person and 13.7% were one person aged 65 or older. The average household size was 2.75 and the average family size was 3.36.

The median age was 32.6 years. 29% of residents were under the age of 18; 11.3% were between the ages of 18 and 24; 24.5% were from 25 to 44; 21.3% were from 45 to 64; and 13.9% were 65 or older. The gender makeup of the city was 50.7% male and 49.3% female.

2000 census
As of the census of 2000, there were 7,339 people, 2,674 households, and 1,756 families living in the city. The racial makeup as reported by the Census was 86.92% White, 1.59% African American, 0.45% Native American, 0.82% Asian, 0.01% Pacific Islander, 9.02% from other races, and 1.19% from two or more races. Hispanic or Latino of any race were 17.36% of the population.

Racial diversity in Dension has been increasing since the mid-1980s.  According to a New York Times article, 20% of Denison's high-school age children were nonwhite in 2005, compared to approximately 50% of kindergarteners.

Of the 2,674 households 31.7% had children under the age of 18 living with them, 51.9% were married couples living together, 9.1% had a female householder with no husband present, and 34.3% were non-families. 28.9% of households were one person and 15.0% were one person aged 65 or older. The average household size was 2.53 and the average family size was 3.08.

The age distribution was26.0% under the age of 18, 11.2% from 18 to 24, 26.3% from 25 to 44, 19.3% from 45 to 64, and 17.2% 65 or older. The median age was 35 years. For every 100 females, there were 95.3 males. For every 100 females age 18 and over, there were 92.3 males.

The median household income was $33,187 and the median family income  was $41,362. Males had a median income of $30,145 versus $20,538 for females. The per capita income for the city was $15,391. About 6.1% of families and 12.1% of the population were below the poverty line, including 9.7% of those under age 18 and 4.2% of those age 65 or over.

Government
Denison is governed by a mayor and a five-member city council

Mayor 
The Denison Mayor is the chief executive officer of the city and presiding officer of the city council.  The Denison Mayor serves a 2-year term.   The current mayor of Denison is Pam Soseman. (Elected: November 2019 | Term: December 31, 2021) 

Former Mayors of Denison:

 Jared Beymer
 Dan Leinen
 Brad Bonner
 Dennis Fineran
 Nathan Mahrt
 Ken Livingston
 Loren Schultz
 Don Stehr
 Ralph Borcherding
 Jerry Smithson
 Keith Duncan

City Council 
Denison City Council members serve overlapping four-year terms.  The council consists of one representative from each of the city's three wards, plus two at-large representatives.

Administration 
Denison's City Administrator is Terry Crawford.

The City of Denison is organized into  the following departments: Administration, Public Works, Library, Aquatic Center, Fire Department, Police Department, and Conference Center.

Public meetings 
The minutes and agenda for each city council meeting are available in advance on the city's website.

Education
The Denison Community School District operates area public schools.

Notable people

Kyle Borland, NFL player
Charles Congden Carpenter, naturalist and herpetologist
Clarence Duncan Chamberlin, aviation pioneer
James Perry Conner (1851–1924) five-term US Representative from 1900–1909
Chuck Darling, member of 1956 Summer Olympics basketball gold medalists, First team All-American at University of Iowa
Jim Garrison, New Orleans District Attorney who investigated Kennedy assassination conspiracy theories
Arthur C. Greene (1881-1958), member of the Iowa House of Representatives
James E. Hansen, head of NASA's Goddard Institute for Space Studies
Donna Reed, Academy Award-winning actress; Donna Reed Foundation's headquarters are in Denison
Brandon Scherff, offensive guard for the NFL's Washington Commanders and Jacksonville Jaguars
L.M. Shaw (1848–1932) 17th Governor of Iowa and United States Secretary of the Treasury

National Register of Historic Places
 Carey House
 Clarence D. Chamberlin House
 Crawford County Courthouse
 Park Motel
 William A. McHenry House
 Yellow Smoke Park Bridge

References

Further reading
Pulitzer Prize-winning author Dale Maharidge depicts a changing Denison in the early twenty-first century in his book Denison, Iowa: Searching for the Soul of America Through the Secrets of a Midwest Town. This book features photographs by Maharidge's photographic partner and fellow Pulitzer-winner, Michael Williamson.

External links 

 
Official Denison City Website
Denison Community Schools The Monarchs
City Data Comprehensive Statistical Data and more about Denison, Iowa

 
Cities in Iowa
Cities in Crawford County, Iowa
County seats in Iowa